Radoslava Mavrodieva-Yankova (born 13 March 1987, in Sliven) is a Bulgarian athlete specialising in the shot put. She represented her country at the 2012 Summer Olympics failing to get a legal mark in the qualification. She won her first major medal, a bronze, at the 2015 European Indoor Championships.

She has personal bests of 18.95 metres outdoors (Stara Zagora 2018) and 19.12 metres indoors (Glasgow 2019).

Her younger sister, Zheniam, is also a shot putter.

Competition record

References

Bulgarian female shot putters
Athletes (track and field) at the 2012 Summer Olympics
Athletes (track and field) at the 2016 Summer Olympics
Olympic athletes of Bulgaria
1987 births
Living people
Sportspeople from Sliven
European Athletics Indoor Championships winners